Heidi Venamore is the Australian Ambassador to the Unites Arab Emirates since January 2020, and was the ambassador to Jordan (2012–2016).

Venamore earned a Master of Laws from the University of Cambridge, a Graduate Diploma in Foreign Affairs and Trade from the Australian National University, and a Bachelor of Arts/Bachelor of Laws from the University of Queensland.

References

Living people
Year of birth missing (living people)
Australian women ambassadors
Ambassadors of Australia to the United Arab Emirates
Alumni of the University of Cambridge
University of Queensland alumni
Australian National University alumni